Primitive Man is an American doom metal band from Denver, Colorado, composed of Ethan Lee McCarthy on vocals and guitar, Jonathan Campos on bass, and Joe Linden (who has replaced founding member Bennet Kennedy) on drums. They are known for an extremely harsh sound – combining funeral doom, noise music, and black metal elements – and blunt nihilistic outlook. Their third studio album Immersion was released through Relapse Records in 2020.

History 
The band was formed in February 2012 by guitarist-vocalist Ethan Lee McCarthy, bassist Jonathan Campos and drummer Bennet Kennedy. In October 2012, the band recorded their debut album Scorn at Flatline Audio under the direction of Dave Otero (Cephalic Carnage, Cattle Decapitation, Cobalt, Catheter). The album was released in cooperation with the labels Throatruiner Records and Mordgrimm. After the release, Isidro "Spy" Soto joined the band as the temporary live and in session drummer.  In February 2013, the band released a demo tape titled P//M, which contained eleven songs. In June 2013, the band signed a deal with Relapse Records, who reissued Scorn this summer. In July and August, the band embarked on their first US tour with Reproacher.  Since then, the band and has done many subsequent tours in the United States, Europe, Japan, Australia, New Zealand and Southeast Asia.

Members 
Current
 Ethan Lee McCarthy – guitars, vocals (2012-present)
 Jonathan Campos – bass (2012-present)
 Joe Linden – drums (2015-present)

Former
 Bennet Kennedy – drums (2012-2013)
 Spy Soto – drums (2013-2015)

Timeline

Discography 

Studio albums
 Scorn (2013)
 Caustic (2017)
 Immersion (2020)
 Suffocating Hallucination (2023) (collaboration with Full of Hell)

EPs
 Home Is Where the Hatred Is (2015)
 Futility" + "Untitled (2015)
 Insurmountable (2022)

Demos
 P//M (2013)
 Steel Casket (2018)

Splits
 With Xaphan (2014)
 With Hexis (2014)
 With Hessian (2014)
 With Fister (2014)
 With Northless (2016)
 With Sea Bastard (2016)
 With Unearthly Trance (2018)
 With Hell (2019)

References 

American sludge metal musical groups
American doom metal musical groups
Noise musical groups
Heavy metal musical groups from Colorado
Musical groups from Denver
2012 establishments in Colorado
Musical groups established in 2012